Mercedes Doretti (born 1959) is an Argentine forensic anthropologist based in New York City. She is known for finding evidence of crimes against humanity. She was awarded a MacArthur "Genius Grant" prize in 2007.

Life
Her mother is Magdalena Ruiz Guinazu, a radio journalist.

She helped found the Argentine Forensic Anthropology Team. In 1992, she opened the team's New York office and expanded her work globally.

She has lectured at University of California, Berkeley, Harvard University, Massachusetts Institute of Technology, Columbia University, State University of New York at Purchase, New School for Social Research, Rutgers University, Amnesty International, The Carter Center, and the World Archaeological Congress.

In 2016, Doretti was named to the BBC's annual list of 100 Women.

Awards
 2007 MacArthur Fellows Program
 2016 Honorary Doctorate from The New School

Works

Film
 Following Antigone: Forensic Anthropology and Human Rights Investigations (EAAF Witness production 2002). Co-producer

References

External links
"Argentine Forensic Anthropology Team "
"laying the dead to rest", Speaking of Faith, March 19, 2009
"Unearthing the Truth: an Interview with Mercedes Doretti", International Center for Transitional Justice, September 1, 2007
"Mercedes Doretti", La Plaza

Forensic anthropologists
People from Buenos Aires
1959 births
Living people
Argentine anthropologists
MacArthur Fellows
Women forensic scientists
Argentine women anthropologists
20th-century anthropologists
21st-century anthropologists
University of Buenos Aires alumni
Women human rights activists
BBC 100 Women